The America Zone was one of the two regional zones of the 1932 International Lawn Tennis Challenge.

8 teams entered the America Zone: 5 teams competed in the North & Central America Zone, while 3 teams competed in the South America Zone. The winner of each sub-zone would play against each other to determine who moved to the Inter-Zonal Final to compete against the winner of the Europe Zone.

The United States defeated Australia in the North & Central America Zone final, and Brazil, as the only competing team in the South America Zone, received a walkover. In the Americas Inter-Zonal Final, the United States defeated Brazil and went on to face Germany in the Inter-Zonal Final.

North & Central America Zone

Quarterfinals

United States vs. Canada

Semifinals

United States vs. Mexico

Cuba vs. Australia

Final

United States vs. Australia

South America Zone

Americas Inter-Zonal Final

United States vs. Brazil

References

External links
Davis Cup official website

Davis Cup Americas Zone
America Zone
International Lawn Tennis Challenge